Sindhis in India (Sindhi, Devanagari: सिन्धी, Sindhī, Naskh script: سنڌي) refer to a socio-ethnic group of people living in the republic of India, originating from Sindh (a province of modern-day Pakistan). After the 1947 Partition of India into the dominions of new Muslim-majority Pakistan and remaining Hindu-majority India, a million non-Muslim Sindhis migrated to independent India. As per the 2011 census of India, there are 2,772,364 Sindhi speakers in India. However, this number does not include ethnic Sindhis who no longer speak the language.

Independence of India and Partition of India 

After the Partition of India, the majority of the minority Hindus and Sikhs in Pakistan migrated to India, while the Muslim migrants from India settled down in Pakistan. Approximately 10 million Hindus and Sikhs migrated to India, while nearly an equal number of Muslims migrated to newly-created Pakistan from India. Hindu Sindhis were expected to stay in Sindh following the partition, as there were good relations between Hindu and Muslim Sindhis. At the time of partition there were 1,400,000 Hindu Sindhis, though most were concentrated in cities such as Hyderabad, Karachi, Shikarpur, and Sukkur. However, many Sindhi Hindus decided to leave Pakistan.

Problems were further aggravated when incidents of violence broke out in Karachi after partition. According to the census of India 1951, nearly 776,000 Sindhi Hindus were forced to migrate to India to avoid conversion to Islam. Despite this migration of Hindus, a significant Sindhi Hindu population still resides in Pakistan's Sindh province where they numbered around 2.28 million in 1998 and 4.21 million as per the 2017 census of Pakistan, while the Sindhi Hindus in India numbered 2.57 million in 2001. As of 2011 population was around 2.77 million out of which around 1.7 million (17 lakh) speak Sindhi and around 1 million speak Kachchhi.

The responsibility of rehabilitating refugees was borne by their respective government. Refugee camps were set up for Hindu Sindhis. Many people abandoned their fixed assets and crossed newly formed borders. Many refugees overcame the trauma of poverty, though the loss of a homeland has had a deeper and lasting effect on their Sindhi culture. In 1967 the Government of India recognized the Sindhi language as a fifteenth official language of India in two scripts. In late 2004, the Sindhi diaspora vociferously opposed a Public Interest Litigation in the Supreme Court of India, which asked the Government of India to delete the word "Sindh" from the Indian National Anthem (written by Rabindranath Tagore prior to the partition) on the grounds that it infringed upon the sovereignty of Pakistan.

Resettlement of refugees

Adipur
Soon after the partition of Pakistan from India in 1947, a large group of refugees from Sindh in Pakistan, came to India. Adipur was founded by the Indian government as a refugee camp. Its management was later passed onto a self-governing body called the Sindhu Resettlement Corporation (SRC). The person credited with the formation of this settlement was Bhai Pratap Dialdas, who requested the land from Mohandas Gandhi for the mostly Sindhi immigrants from Pakistan.  of land was donated by the Maharaj of Kutch, His Highness Maharao Shri Vijayrajji Khengarji Jadeja at the request of Mohan Das Gandhi because it was felt that the climate and culture of Kutch resembled that of Sindh. Adipur, like Gandhidham, was built on the donated land to rehabilitate Hindu Sindhi refugees coming from Sindh. The Indian Institute of Sindhology established at Adipur, Gandhidham (Kutch), is a centre for advanced studies and research in fields related to the Sindhi language, .

Ahmedabad
Ahmedabad's population increased dramatically in when many households and individuals of Hindu Sindhi descendants arrived from Pakistan for refuge into Ahmedabad. Kubernagar was established with barracks (houses), which were allocated to the refugees who arrived into Ahmedabad.

Gandhidham
The Maharaja of Kutch, His Highness Maharao Shri Vijayrajji Khengarji Jadeja, at the request of Mohandas Gandhi, gave 15,000 acres (61 km2) of land to Bhai Pratap, who founded the Sindhu Resettlement Corporation to rehabilitate Sindhi Hindus uprooted from their motherland. The Sindhi Resettlement Corporation (SRC) was formed with Acharaya Kriplani as chairman and Bhai Pratap Dialdas as managing director. The main objective of the corporation was to assist in the rehousing of displaced persons by the construction of a new town on a site a few miles inland from the location selected by the Government of India for the new port of Kandla on the Gulf of Kachchh. The first plan was prepared by a team of planners headed by Dr. O. H. Koenigsberger, director of the Government of India's division of housing. This plan was subsequently revised by Adams Howard and Greeley company in 1952. The town's foundation stone was laid with the blessings of Mohandas Gandhi, and hence the town was named Gandhidham.

Ulhasnagar
Ulhasnagar, Maharashtra is a municipal town and the headquarters of the Tehsil bearing the same name. It is a railway station on the Mumbai-Pune route of the Central Railway. Ulhasnagar, a colony of Sindhi Hindu refugees, is 61 years old. Situated 58 km from Mumbai, the once-barren land has developed into a town in the Thane district, Maharashtra. Originally, known as Kalyan Military transit camp (or Kalyan Camp), Ulhasnagar was set up especially to accommodate 6,000 soldiers and 30,000 others during World War II. There were 2,126 barracks and about 1,173 housed personnel. The majority of barracks had large central halls with rooms attached to either end. The camp had a deserted look at the end of the war and served as a ready and ideal ground for the partition refugees. Sindhi refugees, in particular, began life anew in Ulhasnagar after the partition of India.

Cox Town, Bangalore
Refugee Sindhi Hindus from Hyderabad migrated to Bangalore through Mumbai and Goa. A community housing society was created in Cox Town, with a temple, Sindhi Association and a Sindhi Social Hall, a community hub for celebrations, marriages and festivals such as Holi and Guru Nanak Jayanti.  The immigration of the community resulted in the introduction of Sindhi culture and cuisine to the city.

Official status of the Sindhi language 

Although Sindhi was not a regional language in a well-defined area, there were persistent demands from the Sindhi-speaking people for the inclusion of Sindhi language in the Eighth Schedule of the Constitution. The Commissioner for Linguistic Minorities also recommended the inclusion. On 4 November 1966, it was announced that the Government had decided to include the Sindhi language in the Eighth Schedule of the Indian Constitution. At the 2001 census, there were 2,571,526 Sindhi speakers in India.

Sindhi people 

The Sindhi people live mainly in the north-western part of India. Many Sindhis inhabit the states of Rajasthan, Gujarat, Maharashtra and Madhya Pradesh as well as the Indian capital of New Delhi. Most Sindhis of India follow the Hindu religion (90%), although Sindhi Sikhs are a prominent minority (5-10%). There are many Sindhis living in various cities in India, including Jalgaon(MH), Ulhasnagar(MH), Kalyan(MH), Mumbai, Mumbai Suburban, Thane, Pune, Gandhidham, Surat, Rajkot, Jamnagar, Adipur, Gandhinagar, Ahmedabad, Bhavnagar, Bhopal (Bairagarh), Ajmer, Jaisalmer, Delhi, Chandigarh, Jaipur, Bangalore, Visakhapatnam, Hyderabad, Chennai, Raipur, Indore, Gondia, Nagpur, Jabalpur, Katni (MP), Narsinghpur , Satna(MP), Sagar, Rewa, Bilaspur, Dhule, Maihar, Itarsi, Aurangabad(MH), Kolkata, Lucknow , Kanpur, Agra, Varanasi,  National Capital Region, etc.

Sindhi festivals

One of the oldest civilizations of human history, Sindhis have a rich and clearly distinct cultural heritage and are very festive. Their most important festival is Cheti Chand, the birthday of Lord Jhulelal. Besides this, they celebrate Akhand teej (Akshaya Tritiya) and Teejri (Teej).

Sindhi Sikhs 
With the teachings of Guru Nanak during one of his travels to Sindh, many Hindu Sindhis adopted Sikhism. Many Hindu Sindhi women learned the Gurmukhī alphabet  to enable them to read the Guru Granth Sahib. Many Amils, a sect of Hindu Sindhis, adopted Sikhism. There used to be a time, before the partition of India, when many non-Muslim Sindhis were Sehajdhari/Nanakpanthi Sikhs.

During the early 1900s, the Chief Khalsa Diwan of Amritsar sent out missionary groups once a year to Sindh to work among the Sehajdhari Sindhis. Over a period of 30 years with scarce resources this missionary activity resulted in an increase from 1,000 Keshdhari Sindhis in 1901 to over 39,000 in 1941 a significant number in those days.

The bond of the Sehajdhari Sindhis with Sikhism is legendary. Like the Sikhs of Punjab, the Sehajdhari Sikhs of Sindh also left behind their homeland and are now dispersed all over India and abroad. There are about 30 million Sindhis in Sindh province of Pakistan and about 3.8 million in India. Their main pilgrimage centres are Nankana Sahib and Dera Sahib in Punjab, and Sadh Bela near Sukkur in Sindh. Sadh Bela is an Udasi shrine built in 1823.

In March 2013 a section of the Sindhis declared themselves no longer Sikhs. They returned the Guru Granth Sahib to the leaders of the Sikh community.

Institutes established by Sindhi Hindus 
Following is the list of Institutes, Colleges, Universities established and run by Sindhi Hindus in India and abroad.
 D. J. Sindh Government Science College
 Narayan Jagannath High School

See also 

 Sindhi diaspora
 Sindhis
 Sindhi language
 List of Sindhi people
 Sindhi Hindus
 Sindhi Colony, Secunderabad

References 

India
Sindhi people